Massapequa Park is a village and hamlet located within the town of Oyster Bay in Nassau County, on the South Shore of Long Island, in New York, United States. The population was 17,008 at the 2010 census. 

Areas south and east of the village borders are considered the hamlet of Massapequa because they are under the jurisdiction of the Town of Oyster Bay rather than the village. The hamlet shares the same zip code, fire department and school district as the village.

History
The village located on the South Shore of Long Island shares the early Native American history of Massapequa. Then, in the 19th century, families of German descent relocated from Brooklyn to what is now Massapequa Park, and the resulting community was known as Wurtenberg or Stadtwurtemburg. The main attraction and center of activity was the Woodcastle Hotel, a rooming house built in 1868 on Front Street next to the fire department as a summer resort. It was destroyed by fire in 1952 and replaced by houses.

In 1928 readers of The New York Times saw ads for Massapequa Park, a development built by a real estate firm owned by Michael J. Brady, Frank Cryan and Peter Colleran. The three Irish-Americans described their project as having a bit of Old Erin and the area between Sunrise Highway and Merrick Road still has its mostly Irish street names.

In 1931, Massapequa Park was incorporated as a village to ensure control of land use and other issues. Several dozen kit houses from Sears Roebuck were built in two different areas of the Village. These include some of the largest model kit houses offered by Sears.

The village once had its own airport, the Fitzmaurice Flying Field, named in 1929 for James Fitzmaurice, one of a crew of three to be the first to fly a plane from east to west across the Atlantic (Baldonne, Ireland to Greenly Island in Labrador, Canada). An estimated 100,000 people came to the dedication of the field on Spruce Street. The field was used by private planes. The field was eventually closed and became the home for the athletic fields of the 4M Club, a popular youth athletic program founded by Larry Neusse, and supported by a wide range of local residents. Today the site is home to McKenna Elementary School (which used to be a junior high school) and the Nassau County Police Academy (which used to be Hawthorn Elementary School).

The area grew in 1973 when the Sunrise Mall (now Westfield Sunrise) was built off Carmans Road and became a hangout for many Massapequa baby-boomers.

Geography

The village is in the southern part of the town of Oyster Bay on Long Island in the state of New York.

It is bordered by Massapequa to the west, East Massapequa to the east, North Massapequa to the northwest, and South Farmingdale to the north. South Oyster Bay is the water body to the south.

Demographics

As of the census 2010, there were 17,008 people, 5,731 households, and 4,736 families residing in the village. There were 5,844 housing units at an average density of 2,656.4 per square mile (1,043.6/km2). The racial makeup of the village was 96.9% White, 0.3% African American, 0.04% Native American, 1.5% Asian, 0.01% Pacific Islander, 0.5% from other races, and 0.7% from two or more races. Hispanic or Latino of any race were 4.5% of the population.

There were 5,731 households, out of which 36.4% had children under the age of 18 living with them, 70.7% were headed by married couples living together, 9.2% had a female householder with no husband present, and 17.4% were non-families. 14.9% of all households were made up of individuals, and 9.2% were someone living alone who was 65 years of age or older. The average household size was 2.97 and the average family size was 3.31.

In the village, the population was spread out, with 24.6% under the age of 18, 6.5% from 18 to 24, 23.2% from 25 to 44, 29.5% from 45 to 64, and 16.1% who were 65 years of age or older. The median age was 42.5 years. For every 100 females, there were 94.1 males. For every 100 females age 18 and over, there were 89.6 males.

The three main ethnic backgrounds are Italian [45%], Irish [28%] and German [18%], comprising over three-fourths of the village's population. The rest of the population is of English, Russian, Polish, Swedish, Scottish, Greek, French, Dutch, and other background.

The median income in the village for 2010 was $98,725 and the median income for a family was $110,417. The per capita income for the village was $38,226. About 1.0% of families and 1.4% of the population were below the poverty line, including 1.3% of those under age 18 and 2.5% of those age 65 or over.

Education
During the 1960s, 1970s and much of the 1980s, the Massapequa School District had seven elementary schools (Carman Road, East Lake, Birch Lane, Fairfield, Unqua, Hawthorn, Lockhart), two junior high schools (McKenna and Ames) and two high schools (Massapequa and Alfred G. Berner). In 1987, the Massapequa school district restructured the district by leasing Carmans Road elementary to Nassau BOCES and Hawthorne Elementary to the Nassau County Police Academy. John P. McKenna Jr. High School was converted to an elementary school, while Alfred G. Berner became the new junior high, later becoming a middle school. J. Lewis Ames Jr. High School is no longer a middle school, but a "9th Grade Center", the Ames Campus of Massapequa High School. The northern section of the village and hamlet are served by the Farmingdale School District.

Notable people

 Phil Baroni, mixed martial arts fighter
 Matt Bennett, actor known for Victorious
 Candy Darling, Warhol superstar
 Roy DeMeo, mafioso in the Gambino crime family
Michael Durso, member of the New York State Assembly
 Carlo Gambino, late don of the Gambino crime family 
 Anthony Ingrassia, American playwright, producer, and director
 Ron Kovic, author Born on the Fourth of July, graduated Massapequa High School in 1964
 Stanley Newman, puzzle creator, editor, and publisher

References

External links
 Official website

Oyster Bay (town), New York
Villages in New York (state)
Villages in Nassau County, New York